The Pandit Nehru Bus Station (PNBS), also known as the Telugu Satavahana Prayana Pranganam, is a bus station in Vijayawada, situated on the southern side of the main city and adjacent to the Krishna River. It is owned by the Andhra Pradesh State Road Transport Corporation (APSRTC). This Bus station is spread over an area of 28 acres of land and it is one of the largest Bus station in India preceding by Mofussil Bus Terminus in Chennai (36.5 acres) and following by Mahatma Gandhi Bus Station in Hyderabad (20 acres). It consists of four blocks, two main blocks serving departure terminal with 48 platforms and arrival terminal with 12 platforms, one RTC House serving as a NTR Administrative block headquarters of APSRTC and one block namely City Bus Port serving city buses. There are four entrances to the bus station, each serving as entrance and exit. The entries are from North Side (City Bus Port), East Side (Main entrances) and two on South Side (in front of NH-65 in Krishna Lanka).

Administration 
The bus station has an administrative block named 'RTC House', which is the headquarters of APSRTC.

Platforms

Structure and services 

The Deccan Queen of the Nizam State Railways - Road Transport Division is one of the notable features of the station. This bus stand is associated with a city bus station adjacent to it. This bus stand operates city buses in and outside of the city. The station operates buses to major destinations of the state and to neighbouring states like Telangana, Tamil Nadu, Karnataka, Odisha and Chhattisgarh. Amaravati, Deluxe, Telugu Velugu, Express, Garuda, Garuda Plus, Indra, Super Luxury and Vennela are the fleets of buses operated from the station by the APSRTC. Palle velugu, Express, Deluxe, Super Luxury, Rajadhani A/C, Vajra A/C, Garuda, Garuda Plus are some of buses operated by TSRTC. The station provides amenities such as miniplex, ticket-vending and kiosks for passengers, and has a city bus port for local passengers.

Vijayawada city bus port 

The Vijayawada City Bus Port, formerly Vijayawada City Terminal, is situated to the north of the Pandit Nehru Bus Station. Built in 1990, it is a bus station that caters the city bus services. The bus station has 10 platforms and an office for city bus related information.

Services 
 City Ordinary - These city buses are the cheapest mode of transport in the city and connect the city with its suburbs, exurbs and rural areas.
 Metro Express and Metro Deluxe - These city buses operate as superfast services on trunk routes connecting the important centres of the city with its suburbs, exurbs and rural areas.
 Metro Deluxe AC and Metro Luxury AC - These buses connect the city with the Vijayawada International Airport and the city of Guntur.

References

Bus stations in Andhra Pradesh
Transport in Vijayawada
Monuments and memorials to Jawaharlal Nehru
Buildings and structures in Vijayawada
Buildings and structures completed in 1990
1990 establishments in Andhra Pradesh
20th-century architecture in India